Cupriavidus alkaliphilus is a bacterium of the genus Cupriavidus and the family Burkholderiaceae which was isolated from the rhizosphere of agricultural plants which grow on alkaline soils in northeast Mexico.

References

External links
Type strain of Cupriavidus alkaliphilus at BacDive -  the Bacterial Diversity Metadatabase

Burkholderiaceae
Bacteria described in 2012